Samuel McKee McCrory (11 October 1924 – 4 May 2011) was a professional footballer from Northern Ireland, most notably spending five years with Southend United and scoring the first goal at their Roots Hall stadium.

Club career
McCrory was born in Belfast. After turning professional with Irish League side Linfield in 1944, for whom he scored in two consecutive Irish Cup final victories: against rivals Glentoran in 1945 (scoring two) and Distillery in 1946. After scoring 60 goals in 91 games for Linfield he moved to Swansea Town in October 1946. He was relegated in his first season with the club before helping them win the Football League Third Division South in 1949. He also played in the Welsh Cup final in 1949, in which the Swans were defeated 2-0 by Merthyr Tydfil.

He moved to Ipswich Town in March 1950 but did not get off to a great start to his career with the Tractor Boys; he became the first Ipswich player to be sent off in league football in a match against Aldershot in April 1950. However the following season he was their top goalscorer in all competitions, and in total made over 100 appearances for the club.

He then had a spell with Plymouth Argyle but struggled for form in the Second Division, before moving to Southend United in 1955. He scored the first goal at United's new stadium, Roots Hall, on 20 August 1955 against Norwich City. He was also the joint top scorer of the last edition of the Third Division South with 31 goals in the 1957–58 season. After leaving Southend in 1960 he joined Southern League side Cambridge United, where he spent two years before returning home for a one-year spell as player-manager of Irish League side Crusaders.

After retiring, he settled in Donaghadee where he ran a pub. McCrory died in 2011 at the age of 86.

International career
He earned a cap for Northern Ireland in 1957, scoring in a 3–2 victory over England, and at the age of 33 was at that time the side's oldest post-World War II debutant. He was also part of the 1958 FIFA World Cup squad although he did not feature at the tournament.

Honours
Linfield
Irish Cup: 1944–45, 1945–46
Gold Cup: 1944–45

Swansea Town
Third Division South: 1948–49

References

External links
Sammy McCrory, Post War English & Scottish Football League A - Z Player's Transfer Database

1924 births
2011 deaths
Association footballers from Northern Ireland
Linfield F.C. players
Swansea City A.F.C. players
Ipswich Town F.C. players
Plymouth Argyle F.C. players
Southend United F.C. players
Cambridge United F.C. players
Crusaders F.C. players
Crusaders F.C. managers
1958 FIFA World Cup players
Northern Ireland international footballers
Association footballers from Belfast
Association football inside forwards
English Football League players
Irish League representative players
Football managers from Northern Ireland